Maison Marou is a gourmet Vietnamese chocolate company based in Ho Chi Minh City, Vietnam. Founded in 2011 by Samuel Maruta and Vincent Mourou, Maison Marou sources cacao from 6 provinces in southern Vietnam. The company operates 7 shops in Ho Chi Minh City and Hanoi. Maison Marou chocolate has received acclaim from the International Chocolate Awards and Salon du Chocolat.

In 2021, Mekong Capital announced an investment in Maison Marou as part of the company's Mekong Enterprise Fund IV.

References 

Companies based in Ho Chi Minh City
Vietnamese companies established in 2011